Bengal Group (also known as Bengal group of Industries) is a Bangladeshi conglomerate. It was established in 1969. It includes Bengal Plastic the largest plastic manufacturer in Bangladesh. Morshed Alam, a member of parliament from Awami League, is the chairman of the Bengal Group of Industries. The Vice chairman of the group is Md Jashim Uddin, younger brother of Morshed Alam.

History
Bengal Group of Industries was established in 1969 by Morshed Alam in rented factory in Old Dhaka.

In 2004, Jashim Uddin became the president of Bangladesh Plastic Goods Manufacturers and Exporters Association. In June, Bengal Group purchased Rahmania Biscuit and Bread Industries.

In March 2007, a fire started at the headquarters of the group in first floor of BSEC Bhaban in Karwan Bazar leaving four dead and 36 injured. The office of Dandy Dying also burned down on the eight floor.

In 2008, The Daily Star and DHL Express awarded Enterprise of the Year 2007 to Bengal Plastic.

Morshed Alam was elected chairman of Mercantile Bank in 2011.

In February 2015, Bengal Plastic announced a 500 million expansion plan. It raised 500 million taka through Commercial papers for Bengal Plastic. Bengal Plastics manufactures products for Mainetti Group.

In September 2017, Bengal Group signed an agreement to receive a loan from International Finance Corporation and FMO (Netherlands) to build a luxury hotel, Swissôtel Dhaka, in Dhaka. The loan will be arranged by Mutual Trust Bank Limited. Bengal Group requested permission to open a bank. Bengal Group signed an agreement Dhaka Power Distribution Company Limited to build rooftop power plants and sell the electricity to Dhaka Power Distribution Company for 9.8 taka per unit. Bengal Group would own and operate the solar cells built on the buildings of Bangladesh Institute of Bank Management, Department of Fisheries, Directorate Of Secondary & Higher Education, Shaheed Suhrawardi Indoor Stadium, Shilpakala Academy, and Uttara Haji Camp.

In February 2020, Bangladesh Bank approved the request for Bengal Bank Limited with a paid up capital of 5 billion taka.

Bengal Cement signed an agreement to supply cement for the Dhaka Elevated Expressway in 2022. It flew dealers of Bengal Plastic on a trip to Nepal. Bengal Plastic was awarded gold in export trophies for 13 years in a row. The 24 outlet of Happy Mart opened in October in Mohammadpur.

List of business and concerns 
 Bengal Plastic Limited
 Bengal Polymer Wares Limited
 Bengal Windsor Thermoplastics Limited
 Bengal Adhesive and Chemical Products Limited
 Bengal Melamine Limited
 Bengal Corrugated Carton Industries Limited
 Hamilton Metal Corporation Limited
 Happy Mart (Bengal Retails Limited)
 Bengal Plastic Pipes Limited
 Bengal Cement Limited
 Bengal Poly & Paper Sack Limited
 Bengal FlexiPac Limited
 Romania Food and Beverage Limited
 Lexus Biscuit Limited
 Designer Fashion Limited
 Bengal Bank Limited
 Bengal Feed & Fisheries Limited
 Euphoria Apparels Limited
 Designer Washing & Dyeing Limited
 RTV
 Look@Me
 Future Infrastructure Limited
 Bengal Concept and Holdings Limited
 Linnex (Bangladesh) Industries Limited
 Linnex Technologies Limited
 Bengal LPG Limited
 Bengal Renewable Energy Limited
 Power Utility Company Limited
 AJ Oversees Company Limited
 Bengal Hotels and Resorts

References 

Conglomerate companies of Bangladesh
1969 establishments in East Pakistan
Conglomerate companies established in 1969
Manufacturing companies based in Dhaka